Éder Monteiro Fernandes, sometimes known as just Éder (born 21 September 1983), is a Brazilian professional footballer who plays for Barretos as a defender.

Career 
Monteiro kicked off his professional career in 2001 with Independência. This was followed by his stints at Americano RJ and Vasco da Gama, the latter in the country's top tier where his teammate was World Cup winner Romário. In September 2010, Éder Monteiro signed for Portuguese Primeira Liga club Rio Ave but he could get international clearance two weeks later. In 2013, he was loaned to the Greek club Kerkyra.

India 
After playing two seasons with the Cypriot club Nea Salamis between 2013 and 2015, Éder Monteiro switched clubs and countries by signing for Indian Super League franchise Chennaiyin FC in August 2015, where he joined Elano and Bernard Mendy. Upon signing the contract, he said he would bring his "experience of playing in other leagues of Europe" and that he would also "learn a lot" by playing under Marco Materazzi. He made his debut for the franchise on 5December, against FC Pune City, coming as a 77th-minute substitute for Manuele Blasi in a 1–0 victory. He made a further appearance in Chennaiyin's 3–0 triumph over Atletico de Kolkata replacing Jeje Lalpekhlua in the last minute of the match.

After the league was over, Éder Monteiro signed for I-League club Salgaocar, becoming the fourth and final foreigner for the Malky Thomson-led side. Joining Chennaiyin teammates Karanjit Singh and Gilbert Oliveira at the new club, he said that they would help him to settle in his new club. He made his league debut against Aizawl FC where, along with Augustin Fernandes and Reagan Singh, he played as one of the back three.

Career statistics

Honors

Club

Chennaiyin FC
 Indian Super League: 2015 - Champions

References

External links

 
1983 births
Living people
Footballers from São Paulo
Brazilian footballers
Association football defenders
Campeonato Brasileiro Série A players
Primeira Liga players
Super League Greece players
Cypriot First Division players
Indian Super League players
Americano Futebol Clube players
CR Vasco da Gama players
Esporte Clube Noroeste players
Goytacaz Futebol Clube players
Itumbiara Esporte Clube players
Rio Ave F.C. players
A.O. Kerkyra players
Nea Salamis Famagusta FC players
Chennaiyin FC players
Esporte Clube Taubaté players
Barretos Esporte Clube players
Brazilian expatriate footballers
Expatriate footballers in Portugal
Expatriate footballers in Greece
Expatriate footballers in Cyprus
Expatriate footballers in India
Brazilian expatriate sportspeople in Portugal
Brazilian expatriate sportspeople in Greece
Brazilian expatriate sportspeople in Cyprus